Haim Gvati (born 29 January 1901, died 19 October 1990) was a Zionist activist and Israeli politician. He held several ministerial portfolios, and served as Minister of Agriculture between 1964 and 1974.

Biography
Born in Pinsk in the Russian Empire (today in Belarus), Gvati was a member of the Children of Renewal Zionist organisation in his youth. In 1920 he was teaching in a Jewish school in Sevastopol, but later moved to Vilnius (then in Poland) where he was a member of HeHalutz and Tzeiri Zion.

He made aliyah to Mandate Palestine in 1924, and was one of the founders of kibbutz Gvat in 1926, serving as its secretary for several years. He was also a member of the secretariat of HaKibbutz HaMeuhad. Following the split in the kibbutz movement, he moved to Yifat.

Between 1945 and 1949 he was a member of HaMerkaz HaHakla'i. In 1950 he was appointed director general of the Agriculture Ministry, serving until 1958. He was also on the board of Mekorot, the national water company.

Despite not being a member of the Knesset, in 1964 he was appointed Minister of Agriculture by Levi Eshkol. He was elected to the Knesset on the Alignment's list in the 1965 elections and retained his ministerial post, even after he resigned his Knesset seat in January 1966. Despite resigning his seat, he was re-elected in 1969 and continued to serve as Minister of Agriculture. Between December 1969 and July 1970 he also served as Minister of Health, and from 1970 until March 1974 served as Minister of Development.

Although he was not re-elected to the Knesset in the 1973 elections, he continued to serve as Minister of Agriculture until Golda Meir resigned; he was not included in Yitzhak Rabin's new government.

Awards
In 1982, Givati was awarded the Israel Prize, for his special contribution to society and the State, in work and industry.

See also
List of Israel Prize recipients

References

External links
 

1901 births
1990 deaths
People from Pinsk
People from Pinsky Uyezd
Belarusian Jews
Jews from the Russian Empire
Israeli people of Belarusian-Jewish descent
20th-century Israeli Jews
Polish emigrants to Mandatory Palestine
Jews in Mandatory Palestine
Israeli civil servants
Israel Prize for special contribution to society and the State recipients
Kibbutz Movements secretaries
Israeli Labor Party politicians
Alignment (Israel) politicians
Ministers of Agriculture of Israel
Ministers of Development of Israel
Ministers of Health of Israel
Members of the 6th Knesset (1965–1969)
Members of the 7th Knesset (1969–1974)